Alexander Michael Ferlazzo (born 3 April 1995 in Townsville) is an Australian luger who has competed since 2012. He competed in the first-ever Youth Olympics in Innsbruck, Austria, where he finished 19th out of 25th. Ferlazzo also competed for Australia at the 2014 Winter Olympics in Sochi, Russia. He finished 33rd in the men's single competition, 6.518 seconds behind gold medal winner Felix Loch.

References

External links
 
 

1995 births
Living people
Australian male lugers
Olympic lugers of Australia
Lugers at the 2012 Winter Youth Olympics
Lugers at the 2014 Winter Olympics
Lugers at the 2018 Winter Olympics
Lugers at the 2022 Winter Olympics
Sportspeople from Townsville